SKFC may refer to:

 St Kilda Football Club
 Sporting Khalsa F.C.
 Sporting Kilmore Football Club
 Sunbury Kangaroos Football Club